HMS Defence was a  armoured cruiser built for the Royal Navy in the first decade of the 20th century, the last armoured cruiser built for the Royal Navy. She was stationed in the Mediterranean when the First World War began and participated in the pursuit of the German battlecruiser  and light cruiser . The ship was transferred to the Grand Fleet in January 1915 and remained there for the rest of her career.

Defence was sunk on 31 May 1916 during the Battle of Jutland, the largest naval battle of the war. Escorting the main body of the Grand Fleet, the ship was fired upon by one German battlecruiser and four dreadnoughts as she attempted to engage a disabled German light cruiser. She was struck by two salvoes from the German ships that detonated her rear magazine. The fire from that explosion spread to the ship's secondary magazines, which exploded in turn. The entire crew are believed to have been killed, although newspapers of the time made unverified claims of possible survivors.

Description

The engines were powered by 24 Yarrow water-tube boilers. Defence was designed to carry 779 officers and men.

The ship's main armament consisted of four BL 9.2-inch Mark X guns in two twin-gun turrets, one each fore and aft. Her secondary armament of ten BL 7.5-inch Mark II guns were mounted amidships in single turrets. Anti-torpedo boat defence was provided by sixteen QF 12-pounder (three-inch) 18-cwt guns. Defence also mounted five submerged 17.7-inch torpedo tubes, one of which was mounted in the stern.

Construction and career
Defence was ordered as part of the 1904–05 naval construction programme as the last of three  armoured cruisers. She was laid down on 22 February 1905 at the Royal Dockyard in Pembroke Dock, Wales. She was christened on 27 April 1907 by Lady Cawdor and commissioned on 3 February 1909 at the cost of £1,362,970. The ship was briefly assigned to the 5th Cruiser Squadron of the Home Fleet until she was transferred to the 2nd Cruiser Squadron when the Home Fleet reorganised on 23 March 1909. Three months later Defence was reassigned to the 1st Cruiser Squadron. She escorted the ocean liner  in 1911–1912 while the latter ship served as the royal yacht for the newly crowned King George V's trip to India to attend the Delhi Durbar. After the ship returned to Plymouth in early 1912, Defence was transferred to the China Station, where she remained until December when she was ordered to rejoin the 1st Cruiser Squadron in the Mediterranean as flagship.

At the start of the First World War, she was involved in the pursuit of the German warships Goeben and Breslau, but Rear-Admiral Ernest Troubridge decided not to engage Goeben due to the latter's more powerful guns, heavier armour and faster speed. She then blockaded the German ships inside the Dardanelles until the ship was ordered on 10 September to the South Atlantic to take part in the hunt for Admiral Graf von Spee's East Asia Squadron. The order was cancelled on 14 September when it became clear that the German squadron was still in the Eastern Pacific and Defence returned to the Dardanelles. The Admiralty again ordered the ship to the South Atlantic in October to join Rear-Admiral Christopher Cradock's squadron searching for the German ships. Defence, however, had only reached Montevideo, Uruguay by 3 November 1914 when she received word that most of Admiral Cradock's squadron had been destroyed two days previously at the Battle of Coronel. The ship rendezvoused with the battlecruisers  and  later that month and transferred her long-range radio equipment to Invincible before sailing to South Africa to escort a troop convoy to Great Britain. Defence departed Table Bay, Cape Town on 8 December and rejoined the 1st Cruiser Squadron of the Grand Fleet as its flagship upon her arrival.

Defence received a QF 12-pounder (3-inch) 12 cwt anti-aircraft (AA) gun and a QF 3-pounder (47 mm) AA gun in 1915–16. The 12-pounder gun was mounted on the aft superstructure and the 3-pounder on the quarterdeck at the extreme rear.

During the Battle of Jutland on 31 May 1916, she was the flagship of Rear-Admiral Sir Robert Arbuthnot, leading the First Cruiser Squadron. The squadron formed the starboard flank of the cruiser screen, ahead of the main body of the Grand Fleet. Defence was just to the right of the centre of the line. Their shells fell short and the two ships turned to port in pursuit, cutting in front of the battlecruiser , which was forced to turn away to avoid a collision. Shortly afterwards, they spotted the disabled German light cruiser  and closed to engage. The fire from the German ships was heavy and Defence was hit by two salvoes from the German ships that caused the aft 9.2-inch magazine to explode. The resulting fire spread via the ammunition passages to the adjacent 7.5-inch magazines which detonated in turn. The ship exploded at 18:20 with the loss of all hands; between 893 and 903 men were killed.

Defence today
At the time, it was believed that Defence had been reduced to fragments by the explosion, but the wreck was discovered in mid-1984 by Clive Cussler and a NUMA survey of the North Sea and English Channel at coordinates . It was dived upon in 2001 by a team led by nautical archaeologist Innes McCartney and found to be largely intact, despite the violence of her sinking. Defence, along with the other Jutland wrecks, was belatedly declared a protected place under the Protection of Military Remains Act 1986, to discourage further damage to the resting place of approximately 900 men.

Notes

Footnotes

References

External links

 Ships of the World on hmco.com
 HMS Defence page on historyofwar.org
Battle of Jutland Crew Lists Project - HMS Defence Crew List

 

Minotaur-class cruisers (1906)
Ships built in Pembroke Dock
1907 ships
World War I cruisers of the United Kingdom
Maritime incidents in 1916
Ships sunk at the Battle of Jutland
Protected Wrecks of the United Kingdom
Warships lost in combat with all hands
Naval magazine explosions